A leadership election was held by the United Malays National Organisation (UMNO) party on 15 September 1978. It was won by incumbent Prime Minister and acting President of UMNO, Hussein Onn.

Supreme Council election results
[ Source]

Permanent Chairman

Deputy Permanent Chairman

President

Deputy President

Vice Presidents

Supreme Council Members

See also
1982 Malaysian general election
Second Hussein cabinet

References

1978 elections in Malaysia
United Malays National Organisation leadership election
United Malays National Organisation leadership elections